Kalyana Rasi is a 1990 Indian Tamil-language film directed by K.Sivaprasad and produced by Thirumal S. Ganesh. It stars Karthik, Ranjini and Apoorva. The film was released on 14 April 1990.

Cast 

Karthik
Ranjini
Apoorva (debut)
M. N. Nambiar
Jai Ganesh
Anandaraj
Manorama
Varalakshmi
Jothi Chandra
Jaishankar - cameo

Soundtrack
Soundtrack was composed by Gyan Varma.
"Aayiram Thalaimurai" - K. J. Yesudas, K. S. Chithra
"Idhu Veyiladikkum" - Vani Jairam, K. S. Chithra
"Kanniponnu" - Chithra, Sasirekha
"Pathinettu Vayadhu" - M. Jayachandran, K. S. Chithra

References

External links

1990 films
1990s Tamil-language films
Indian romance films
1990s romance films